AIX Connect, formerly known as AirAsia India, is an Indian low-cost airline headquartered in Bangalore (Bengaluru), Karnataka. The airline was a joint venture between Tata Sons and AirAsia Bhd. Tata Sons currently holds a 100% stake in the airline, after AirAsia Bhd sold its remaining 16.33% stake to Air India. It commenced operations in June 2014 with Bangalore as its primary operating base. In December 2022, AirAsia India was renamed AIX Connect.

History

In February 2013, with the Government of India allowing a foreign direct investment of up to 49% in airlines, AirAsia Berhad applied to the Indian Foreign Investment Promotion Board (FIPB) seeking approval for commencing its operations in India. In March 2013, AirAsia announced that it would establish a joint venture with Tata Sons and Telestra Tradeplace with Tata Sons representing the airline with two non-executive directors in the board.

It also planned to hedge 100% of its fuel requirements for the first three years and to achieve an aircraft turnaround time of 25 minutes.

AirAsia planned to begin operations to various tier 2 and tier 3 cities with Chennai International Airport as its main operating base. According to KPMG, the introduction of AirAsia was expected to cause another price war, ultimately leading to an increase in air traffic and some consolidation in the Indian aviation sector. AirAsia initially invested an amount of 50 million and in preparation for its operations in India, it struck deals with online and offline travel agents. On 3 March 2013, the FIPB officially permitted AirAsia to rent or lease aircraft and to carry cargo on its scheduled flights. The airline then applied for permission to schedule aircraft and transport passengers, which the FIPB accepted on 6 March.

AirAsia India was established on 28 March 2013 and became the first foreign airline to set up a subsidiary in India. In April, the airline started recruiting candidates for pilots and cabin crew. As the final procedure to obtain Air Operator Permit, a proving flight was conducted on 1 and 2 May 2014 flying from Chennai to Kochi, Bangalore and Kolkata. On 7 May 2014, the DGCA issued an Air Operator Permit to the company. On 30 May 2014, the airline announced the shifting of its base to Bangalore and its first flight from there to Goa. AirAsia operated its maiden flight on 12 June 2014. In June 2015, the airline made Indira Gandhi International Airport, Delhi its secondary hub for North Indian operations. In August 2015, Tata Sons increased its stake to 40.06% from 30% earlier by injecting fresh equity while Telestra's share was reduced to 10% from 20%. As of July 2019, AirAsia India was the fifth largest low-cost carrier in India, behind IndiGo, SpiceJet, Star Air (India), and GoAir, with a market share of 7.1%.

In January 2018, then managing director and chief executive Amar Abrol announced plans of the company to expect a fleet of 21 aircraft by the year end, which would make it eligible to operate overseas flights. In July 2020, AirAsia India launched an aviation analytics app that would help enhance the operational efficiency of the airline by monitoring and helping manage aircraft turnaround between flights with data analytics in real time.

On 29 December 2020, AirAsia Berhad announced that it would sell a 32.67% stake in AirAsia India to Tata Sons for $37.7 million, including a provision to sell the remaining 16.33% stake for $18.8 million. Tata Sons acquired Air India Limited on 8 October 2021. The Tata Group requested approval from the Competition Commission of India (CCI) to merge AirAsia India with Air India Limited in April 2022, which was granted on 14 June 2022. On 2 November 2022, AirAsia Berhad sold the remaining 16.33% stake to Tata Sons. However, the AirAsia brand can still be used for twelve months.

AirAsia India added the gender-neutral honorific Mx as a third option for passengers booking tickets from June 2022.

The Tata Group which had acquired Air Asia India then changed the airlines name to AIX Connect and announced the airlines merger with Air India Express.

Corporate affairs
AirAsia India is headquartered in the Alpha 3 Building on the property of Kempegowda International Airport, in Devanahalli, Bangalore, India. Prior to the airline's formation, Tony Fernandes, founder of AirAsia group, announced that he would like Ratan Tata to be the chairman of the airline; however the latter refused, though he later consented to being the chief advisor to the AirAsia India management board. On 15 May 2013, AirAsia India appointed management consultant Mittu Chandilya as CEO. A month later, on 17 June, S. Ramadorai, the non-executive vice-chairman of Tata Consultancy Services, was appointed as the chairman of the airline. In April 2016, Amar Abrol replaced Mittu Chandilya as the CEO of the airline. In June 2018, Amar Abrol reportedly quit and in October 2018, AirAsia India announced that Sunil Bhaskaran had been appointed managing director and CEO of the airline.

Former chairman of the Tata Group Cyrus Mistry alleged that there were corporate governance lapses between the two joint venture partners.

Destinations
AIX Connect operates over 200 daily flights connecting 18 destinations across India.

Fleet

, AIX Connect (formerly known as AirAsia India) operates the following aircraft:

References

External links

 

AirAsia
Airlines of India
Low-cost carriers
Airlines established in 2013
2013 establishments in Karnataka
Tata Sons subsidiaries
Tata Airlines
Indian companies established in 2013